Andhagaara is a 2018 Indian Kannada film written and  directed by Jayakumar Manikkam. The film stars Nandish, Naveen Thirthalli, Harish Gunjar and Jithendra in the lead roles. The supporting cast features Sowmya R Gowda.

Synopsis
Andhagaara is a suspense thriller where a gang of goons steals money from the renowned musician Raghu, who turns visually impaired at night.

Plot
The story starts with Raghu who happens to receive a large amount of black money from his father's friend GKP to safeguard it from income tax raids happening around the city. Three persons namely, Gopal (his personal driver), Sharan (his close friend) and Verma (personal manager of his father's friend GKP) enter his house for various reasons. One amongst them attempts to lay their hands on a cache of black money hidden in the house. First ten minutes of the movie introduces the characters after which the story aims to capture the audience with its pace.

In the second half, the story revolves around tricks and techniques set off by visually impaired Raghu, managing to flee the real thief out of the house.

Cast 

 Nandish as Raghu
 Naveen Thirthalli as Verma
 Harish Gunger as Sharan
 Jithendra as Gopal
 Sowmya R Gowda as Jindani

Crew 
 Associate director: Boppanna
 Associate director: Devarajulu Reddy
 Camera : Sudeep Frederic
 Editor: Vamshikrishna
 Music: Mihiraamsh

Production and marketing 
The film was announced in August 2016.
The trailer of the film featured sequences of action and romance, and was released on the video sharing site, YouTube, on 28 March 2018.
The budget of the movie was Rs 47 lakhs. It was shot near Nayandahalli and Mathikere. It took thirty four days to complete.

Soundtrack 

The movie has no songs.

Reception
Upon theatrical release, the film received generally positive reviews from critics. The performances of all the cast, and the film's direction, screenplay and narration received praise from critics.

References

External links 
 
 Official trailer

2018 films
Indian coming-of-age films
Films set in Bangalore
Films shot in Bangalore
Kannada films remade in other languages
2010s Kannada-language films